John D'Or Prairie Aerodrome  is located adjacent to John D'Or Prairie, Alberta, Canada.

References

Registered aerodromes in Alberta